Margaret Moncrieff (6 February 1921 – 12 November 2008) was a Scottish cellist and author writing under the pseudonym Helen McClelland and writing novels in the Chalet School series.

Early life 
In 1921, Moncrieff was born as Helen Margaret Moncrieff in Edinburgh, Scotland. Moncrieff's father was Alexander Moncrieff, Lord Moncrieff, and her mother was Helen Moncrieff (née McClelland Adams, formerly Spens).

In London, Moncrieff studied the cello at the Royal College of Music with Ivor James, and then in Paris, with Pierre Fournier. She went on to a distinguished career as a soloist, chamber musician, and teacher.

Career 
Moncrieff was a professor of cello at the Royal College of Music.

When Moncrieff was in her 60s, she became a writer. In 2003, Moncrieff wrote her memoir.

Personal life 
In 1957, Moncrieff married Alexander Kelly (1929–1996) a pianist, composer, and later head of keyboard studies at the Royal Academy of Music. They had two children: cellist Alison Moncrieff Kelly, and Catriona Kelly, Professor of Russian at New College, Oxford.

Works 
 2001: Time and Again
 2003: Worlds Apart: Memoir of Margaret Moncrieff Kelly

Chalet School 
Montcrieff's entries in the series include:
Joey and Patricia: A Reunion in Guernsey (2000)
Visitors to the Chalet School (2004)

References

1921 births
2008 deaths
Scottish classical cellists
Scottish women novelists
Academics of the Royal College of Music
20th-century Scottish novelists
21st-century Scottish novelists
21st-century Scottish writers
20th-century Scottish women writers
21st-century Scottish women writers
20th-century classical musicians
20th-century Scottish musicians
Women classical cellists
20th-century women musicians
Women music educators
Scottish music educators
Alumni of the Royal College of Music
21st-century memoirists
Scottish memoirists
British women memoirists
20th-century cellists